Yuhua District, is one of eight districts of the prefecture-level city of Shijiazhuang, the capital of Hebei Province, North China, located in the southeast of the urban core of Shijiazhuang. It lies towards the southeastern part of the greater urban area. Several major universities of Shijiazhuang, including Hebei Normal University, Hebei University of Science and Technology, Hebei Medical University, Shijiazhuang Economy Institute, Hebei Professional Art Institute, Shijiazhuang Foreign Language School, are locating in this area. The government of Shijiazhuang and its major affiliates are also located in this region.

The northern part of Yuhua District is Zhongshan Road, one of the major commercial regions in Shijiazhuang.

The highest building in the city, Shijiazhuang TV Tower, is located in this district.

Administrative divisions
There are 9 subdistricts and 2 towns.

References

External links

County-level divisions of Hebei
Shijiazhuang